Laxmi Bank is the 16th commercial bank in Nepal, founded in 2002.

In 2004 Laxmi Bank merged with HISEF Finance Limited, a first-generation finance company. This is the first merger in Nepali corporate history. In 2016, the Bank also acquired Professional Diyalo Bikas Bank, a regional development Bank.

Laxmi Bank is a Category ‘A’ Financial Institution and re-registered in 2006 under the Banks and Financial Institutions Act of Nepal. The Bank’s shares are listed and actively traded in the Nepal Stock Exchange.

The bank also promoted a life insurance company known as Prime Life Insurance in 2007 and holds 15% shareholding stake in it.

The bank is primarily recognized for its stringent credit policies, conservative approach to banking and pioneers in technological innovations in banking services. Laxmi Bank’s microfinance subsidiary – Laxmi Laghubitta Bittiya Sanstha Ltd, a category D financial institution licensed by Nepal Rastra Bank is in operation since 2012.

Ownership structure
The Bank currently has a paid-up capital of Nepalese Rupees 9.81 Billion (as of FY 2018-19) 

Promoter Group - 51.00%
General Public - 49.00%

Subsidiaries

The bank's subsidiaries are as follows:
 Laxmi Capital Market Limited (100%)
 Laxmi Laghubitta Bittiya Sanstha (70%)

References

Laxmi Bank Limited 
Nepal  Rastra Bank 
and “Laxmi Bank – eXpress Money Transfer” (eMT) 
Bank and Financial Institution Act  
Prime Life Insurance

External links
 Official Website

Banks of Nepal
Banks established in 2002
2002 establishments in Nepal